Foyesade Oluokun (born August 2, 1995) is an American football linebacker for the Jacksonville Jaguars of the National Football League (NFL). He played college football at Yale, and was drafted by the Atlanta Falcons in the sixth round of the 2018 NFL Draft.

Early life
Oluokun attended Forsyth School, an elementary school in Clayton, Missouri, where he played basketball, soccer and other outdoor activities. He began playing football at John Burroughs School, where he was a standout on special teams with future Cowboys running back Ezekiel Elliott.

College career
Oluokun played college football for Yale. He tore a pectoral muscle as a junior and was granted an extra semester. As a senior, he was a second-team all-Ivy League selection. He received a degree in economics from Yale, and declared for the 2018 NFL Draft after the 2017 season. Oluokun noted that NFL front offices tend to assume that Ivy League players are a lower caliber of athletes, requiring him to work harder to prove his ability to play professionally.

Professional career
Oluokun did not receive an invitation to the NFL Scouting Combine. On March 8, 2018, Oluokun participated at a Pro Day held at Yale and completed all of the combine drills. Oluokun's time of 4.48 in the 40-yard dash would’ve finished sixth among linebackers at the combine and his time of 4.12 in the short shuttle would’ve been the second-best among linebackers. Oluokun attended pre-draft visits with multiple teams, including the Kansas City Chiefs, Arizona Cardinals, and Indianapolis Colts. At the conclusion of the pre-draft process, Oluokun was projected to be a seventh round pick by the majority of NFL draft experts and scouts. He was ranked as the 20th best linebacker in the draft by DraftScout.com.

Atlanta Falcons
The Atlanta Falcons selected Oluokun in the sixth round with the 200th overall pick in the 2018 NFL Draft. Oluokun was the 27th linebacker drafted in 2018. Oluokun was the 48th Yale player picked in a pro football draft and the first in the NFL Draft since Shane Bannon in 2011.

2018 season
On May 9, 2018, the Falcons signed Oluokun to a four-year, $2.60 million contract with a signing bonus of $146,629.

Oluokun entered training camp slated to be a backup linebacker and special teams player. He impressed coaches with his athleticism and tackling ability during camp and began competing against Duke Riley to be the starting weakside linebacker. Head coach Dan Quinn named Oluokun a backup middle linebacker, behind Deion Jones, to begin the regular season.

He made his professional regular season debut in the Atlanta Falcons' season-opener at the Philadelphia Eagles and made one tackle during their 18–12 loss. On October 7, 2018, Oluokun earned his first career start and recorded five combined tackles as the Falcons lost 41–17 at the Pittsburgh Steelers in Week 5. In Week 6, he collected a season-high ten combined tackles (seven solo) during a 34–29 victory against the Tampa Bay Buccaneers. He finished his rookie season in 2018 with 91 combined tackles (56 solo), one pass deflection, and one forced fumble in 16 games and seven starts. He received an overall grade of 64.6 from Pro Football Focus, 46th among qualifying linebackers in 2018.

2019 season
Oluokun was placed on the reserve/COVID-19 list by the Falcons on August 2, 2020, and was activated three days later.

2020 season
In Week 2 of the 2020 season against the Dallas Cowboys, Oluokun forced two fumbles on consecutive drives in the first quarter; both were recovered by the Falcons, who lost 40–39.

In Week 6 against the Minnesota Vikings, Oluokun recorded his first career interception off a pass thrown by Kirk Cousins during the 40–23 win. In Week 9 against the Denver Broncos, Oluokun recorded 10 tackles, one pass deflection, and recorded his first career sack on Drew Lock during the 34–27 win. Oluokun was named NFC Defensive Player of the Week.

In Week 12 against the Las Vegas Raiders, Oluokun strip-sacked Derek Carr; the ball was recovered by teammate Jacob Tuioti-Mariner during the 43–6 win. In Week 16 against the Kansas City Chiefs, Oluokun intercepted a pass thrown by Patrick Mahomes and made a 51-yard return during the 17–14 loss.

2021 season
Before the season began, new head coach Arthur Smith moved Oluokun to the starting MIKE linebacker position.

In Week 3 against the New York Giants, Oluokun recorded 14 tackles in the 17–14 win. In Week 6 against the Miami Dolphins, Oluokun recorded 13 tackles and an interception in the 30–28 win. In Week 7 against the Carolina Panthers, Oluokun had a career-high 16 tackles in the 13–19 loss.

In Week 16, Oluokun had 14 tackles and intercepted Tim Boyle with less than 40 seconds left, sealing a 20–16 win over the Detroit Lions. His performance earned him NFC Defensive Player of the Week. In Week 17, Oluokun Had 13 total tackles, 2 pass deflections, and intercepted Josh Allen in the 15–29 loss to the Buffalo Bills. He led the league in tackles, the 7th most single season tackles in NFL history.

Jacksonville Jaguars
On March 16, 2022, Oluokun signed a three-year, $45 million deal with the Jacksonville Jaguars.

As shown in the NFL stats section below, Oluokun, again - for the second straight year - led the NFL in tackles in 2022.

NFL career statistics

Regular season

Personal life
The son of immigrants, he is of Nigerian descent.

References

External links
Atlanta Falcons bio
Yale Bulldogs bio

1995 births
Living people
Players of American football from St. Louis
American football linebackers
American football safeties
Yale Bulldogs football players
Timothy Dwight College alumni
Atlanta Falcons players
American sportspeople of Nigerian descent
Jacksonville Jaguars players